I Can't Help Myself may refer to:

 "I Can't Help Myself (Sugar Pie Honey Bunch)", a 1965 song by Four Tops
 "I Can't Help Myself" (Eddie Rabbitt song), 1977
 "I Can't Help Myself" (Bellatrax song), 2008
 "I Can't Help Myself", a 1982 song by Orange Juice,
 "I Can't Help Myself", a robotic arm art piece by Sun Yuan & Peng Yu

See also
 Can't Help Myself (disambiguation)